Clitellaria is a genus of flies in the family Stratiomyidae.

Species
Clitellaria aurantia Yang, Zhang & Li, 2014
Clitellaria aurofasciata (Brunetti, 1924)
Clitellaria bergeri (Pleske, 1925)
Clitellaria bicolor Yang, Zhang & Li, 2014
Clitellaria bilineata (Fabricius, 1805)
Clitellaria chikuni Yang & Nagatomi, 1992
Clitellaria crassistilus Yang & Nagatomi, 1992
Clitellaria ephippium (Fabricius, 1775)
Clitellaria flavipilosa Yang & Nagatomi, 1992
Clitellaria ignifera (Brunetti, 1923)
Clitellaria kunmingana Yang & Nagatomi, 1992
Clitellaria longipilosa Yang & Nagatomi, 1992
Clitellaria mediflava Yang & Nagatomi, 1992
Clitellaria microspina Yang, Zhang & Li, 2014
Clitellaria nigra Yang & Nagatomi, 1992
Clitellaria obliquispina Yang, Zhang & Li, 2014
Clitellaria obtusa (James, 1941)
Clitellaria orientalis (Lindner, 1951)
Clitellaria pontica (Lindner, 1936)
Clitellaria stylata (Brunetti, 1923)

References

Stratiomyidae
Brachycera genera
Taxa named by Johann Wilhelm Meigen
Diptera of Asia
Diptera of Europe